In chemistry, a retort stand, also called a clamp stand, a ring stand, or a support stand, is a piece of scientific equipment intended to support other pieces of equipment and glassware — for instance, burettes, test tubes and flasks.

The typical ring stand consists of a heavy base and a vertical rod, both usually made of metal.  A number of accessories, such as clamps of various types and iron rings, can be attached to the rod by thumbscrews, at whatever heights and orientations are necessary to support the target equipment.

Structure
Retort stands commonly have a cast iron base of around 200 x 125 mm. The rod may be up to 750 mm and screws into a female thread in the base. The height of the rod is sufficient for most experiments and usually fits within fume hoods and glove boxes. If a taller rod is required, the solid base is usually replaced by a tripod for stability when supporting larger apparatuses, such as extremely large tubes, bulk chemical bottles etc. The height can be adjusted by moving the attached point of the given clamp to the stand. The base lowers the centre of gravity of the stand, thus increasing stability.

Uses
Retort stands are often used in the chemistry laboratory. For instance, they are used for distillation experiments (such as organic distillations) and titrations (where they hold a burette). They are also used as supports in filtration.

Gallery

See also
Clamp holder

References

Alchemical tools
Laboratory equipment